The Ministry of Health  is a government ministry of Tanzania. Its central offices are located in Dodoma. Its mission is to "facilitate the provision of basic health services that are good, quality, equitable, accessible, affordable, sustainable[,] and gender sensitive".

It was merged with the Ministry of Health, Community Development, Gender, Elders and Children under John Magufuli's reforms.

Organization

The structure of the ministry is as follows:

Office of the Chief Medical Officer

Preventive Services Division

 Epidemiology and Diseases Control Section
 Reproductive and Child Health Section
 Environmental Health, Hygiene and Sanitation Section
 Health Education and Promotion Section
 Nutritional Services Section

Curative Services Division

 Public and Private Health Services Section
 Diagnostic and Health Care Technical Services Section
 Traditional and Alternative Medicine Section
 Oral Health Services Section
 Non Communicable Diseases, Mental Health and Substance Abuse Section

Human Resources Development Division

 Health Human Resources Planning Section
 Allied Health Sciences Training Section
 Nursing Services Training Section
 Continue Education and Postgraduate Training Section
 Social Welfare Staff Development Section

Health Quality Assurance Division

 Pharmaceutical Services Section
 Health Services Inspectorate and Quality Assurance Section
 Health Emergency Preparedness and Response Section
 Nursing Services Section

Social Welfare Division

 People with Disabilities and Elderly Persons Section
 Family, Child Welfare Services and Early Childhood Development Section
 Juvenile Justice Services Section

Administration and Human Resources Management Division

 Administration Section
 Human Resources Management Section

Policy and Planning Division

 Policy Section
 Planning Section
 Monitoring Evaluation and Performance Reporting Section

Miscellaneous units

 Information and Communication Technology Unit
 Legal Services Unit
 Finance and Accounts Unit
 Government Communication Unit
 Internal Audit Unit
 Procurement Management Unit

See also
 Medical Stores Department
 Government of Tanzania

References

External links
 

H
Tanzania
Medical and health organisations based in Tanzania